Edward Parsons may refer to:

 Edward Parsons (minister) (1762–1833), English Congregational minister and writer.
 Edward Y. Parsons (1842–1876), U.S. Representative from Kentucky
 Edward L. Parsons (1868–1960), American bishop in California
 Edward Parsons (footballer) (1879–1956), English footballer
 Edward Parsons (architect) (1907–1991), American architect in Nevada
 Edward Taylor Parsons (1861–1914), Sierra Club activist, for whom Parsons Memorial Lodge is named